Cosberella is a genus of springtails in the family Hypogastruridae. There are about eight described species in Cosberella.

Species
These eight species belong to the genus Cosberella:
 Cosberella acuminata (Cassagnau, 1952) i c g
 Cosberella arborea (Fjellberg, 1992) i c g
 Cosberella conatoa Wray, 1963 i c g
 Cosberella denali (Fjellberg, 1985) i c g
 Cosberella hibernica (Fjellberg, 1987) i c g
 Cosberella lamaralexanderi Bernard, 2006 i c g
 Cosberella navicularis (Schött, 1893) i c g
 Cosberella yoshiana (Babenko, 2000) i c g
Data sources: i = ITIS, c = Catalogue of Life, g = GBIF, b = Bugguide.net

References

Further reading

 
 
 

Collembola
Springtail genera